The Göta Signal Corps, designations S 1 Sk and S 2, was a Swedish Army signal unit, one of the few new formations raised in the 20th century. It was disbanded in 1997. The unit was garrisoned in Västergötland.

History 

The unit has its origins in a 1944 detached company, Signalregementets kompani i Skövde, of Signal Regiment that was garrisoned in Skövde. The company gained the designation S 1 Sk (1st Signal Regiment, Skövde detachment), and was in 1958 upgraded to a separate battalion, and gained the designation S 2.

The battalion was transferred to Karlsborg in 1961 and was renamed Göta Signal Regiment in 1962 when it was upgraded to regimental size. The Swedish Army Paratroop School was attached to the regiment from 1961 until the regiment was disbanded in 1984. However one battalion of the regiment was kept as part of Life Regiment Hussars as Göta Signal Battalion until it was disbanded in 1997.

Campaigns 
None

Organisation 
?

Heraldry and traditions

Colours, standards and guidons
On 25 August 1962, His Majesty the King Gustaf VI Adolf presented a colour to the then Göta Signal Regiment. When Karlsborg Anti-Aircraft Regiment (Lv 1) was disbanded on 31 March 1961, its colour was transferred to Göta Signal Regiment, which carried it on certain occasions. On 1 July 1984, Göta Signal Regiment was amalgamated as a training battalion into the Life Regiment Hussars (K 3). The colour was then transferred to the Anti-Aircraft Combat School (Luftvärnsskjutskolan, LvSS) on 8 October 1984. Since 1 July 2000, the memory of Karlsborg Anti-Aircraft Regiment is maintained by the Air Defence Regiment (Lv 6).

On 30 April 1996, Supreme Commander, general Owe Wiktorin presented a new colour to Göta Signal Battalion at the Artillery Yard in Stockholm. It was drawn by Kristina Holmgård-Åkerberg and embroidered by machine in insertion technique by the company Libraria. It was used as battalion colour by S 2 until 1 January 1998. Blazon: "On green cloth in the centre a circular shield showing the coat of arms of the unit; azure, three wavy white bends sinister charged with a crowned double-tailed yellow lion rampant, armed and langued gules. The shield ensigned with a royal crown proper. In the first corner a mullet with a cluster of rays and in the second corner the insignia of the Swedish Army Signal Troops; an erect sword entwined with a bolt, all yellow".

Coat of arms
The coat of the arms of the Göta Signal Regiment (S 2) 1977–1994 and the Göta Signal Battalion (K 3/S 2) 1994–1997. Blazon: "Azure, the regimental badge, a double-tailed lion rampant or armed and langued gules. The shield surmounted a cluster of bolts, or".

Commanding officers

1958–1960: Nils Fredrik Schale
1960–1970: Tage Ingemar Bratt
1970–1976: Karl Edvin Eriksson
1976–1980: Håkan Hallgren
1980–1982: Åke Bertil Gunnar Lövdahl
1982–1984: Kurt Olofsson
1984–1987: Per Granath
1987–1989: Nils Göran Anders Nilsson
1989–1991: Bengt-Åke Gelin
1991–1993: Christer Birger Levin
1993–1995: Christer Carl Einar Ejnarsson
1995–1997: Per Jörgen Ivhammar

Names, designations and locations

See also
List of Swedish signal regiments

Footnotes

References

Notes

Print

Further reading

Military communications units and formations of the Swedish Army
Corps of the Swedish Army
Disbanded units and formations of Sweden
Military units and formations established in 1944
Military units and formations established in 1997
1944 establishments in Sweden
1997 disestablishments in Sweden
Skövde Garrison
Karlsborg Garrison